Merooj, Inc., which means ant in Luri language now rebranded as Majid, is an Iranian sports producer and brand of athletic shoes, clothing, and accessories. The company was established by Dr. Majid Saedifar who was an official physical therapist of the Iran national football team. The company has headquarters in Andimeshk, Khuzestan Province, Iran. 

Merooj is known internationally as the official apparel supplier for the FIVB Beach Volleyball World Tour, for the year 2013.

Sponsorship 
Over the years, Merooj has sponsored a huge variety of sports clubs and teams from all over the world, including:

Football

National teams 
 Iran

Club teams 
 Esteghlal
 Sanat naft
 Foolad
 Sepahan
 Havadar

Volleyball

National team 
  Iran
  Kyrgyzstan
  Pakistan
  Turkmenistan
  Uzbekistan

Wrestling
  Azerbaijan National Wrestling Team
  Hungary National Wrestling Team
  Iraq National Wrestling Team
  Romania National Wrestling Team
  Iran National Wrestling Team

References

External links 
 Company website

Clothing companies established in 1987
Sportswear brands
Shoe companies of the United States
Sporting goods manufacturers of the United States
Sporting goods manufacturers of Iran
Manufacturing companies based in Tehran
Iranian brands